Acalolepta fuscosericea is a species of beetle in the family Cerambycidae found in Asia in countries such as the Philippines.,

Acalolepta
Beetles described in 1931